A salp (plural salps, also known colloquially as “sea grape”) or salpa (plural salpae or salpas) is a barrel-shaped, planktic tunicate. It moves by contracting, thereby pumping water through its gelatinous body, one of the most efficient examples of jet propulsion in the animal kingdom. The salp strains the pumped water through its internal feeding filters, feeding on phytoplankton.

Distribution
Salps are common in equatorial, temperate, and cold seas, where they can be seen at the surface, singly or in long, stringy colonies. The most abundant concentrations of salps are in the Southern Ocean (near Antarctica), where they sometimes form enormous swarms, often in deep water, and are sometimes even more abundant than krill. Since 1910, while krill populations in the Southern Ocean have declined, salp populations appear to be increasing. Salps have been seen in increasing numbers along the coast of Washington.

Life cycle
Salps have a complex life cycle, with an obligatory alternation of generations. The solitary life history phase, also known as an oozooid, is a single, barrel-shaped animal that reproduces asexually by producing a chain of tens to hundreds of individuals, which are released from the parent at a small size.

The chain of salps is the 'aggregate' portion of the life cycle. The aggregate individuals are also known as blastozooids; they remain attached together while swimming and feeding, and each individual grows in size. Each blastozooid in the chain reproduces sexually (the blastozooids are sequential hermaphrodites, first maturing as females, and are fertilized by male gametes produced by older chains), with a growing embryo oozooid attached to the body wall of the parent. The growing oozooids are eventually released from the parent blastozooids, and then continue to feed and grow as the solitary asexual phase,  closing the life cycle of salps. The alternation of generations allows for a fast generation time, with both solitary individuals and aggregate chains living and feeding together in the sea. When phytoplankton is abundant, this rapid reproduction leads to fairly short-lived blooms of salps, which eventually filter out most of the phytoplankton. The bloom ends when enough food is no longer available to sustain the enormous population of salps. Occasionally, mushroom corals and those of the genus Heteropsammia are known to feed on salps during blooms.

History
The incursion of a large number of salps (Salpa fusiformis) into the North Sea in 1920 led to a failure of the Scottish herring fishery.

Oceanographic importance
A reason for the success of salps is how they respond to phytoplankton blooms. When food is plentiful, salps can quickly bud off clones, which graze on the phytoplankton and can grow at a rate which is probably faster than that of any other multicellular animal, quickly stripping the phytoplankton from the sea. But if the phytoplankton is too dense, the salps can clog and sink to the bottom. During these blooms, beaches can become slimy with mats of salp bodies, and other planktonic species can experience fluctuations in their numbers due to competition with the salps.

Sinking fecal pellets and bodies of salps carry carbon to the seafloor, and salps are abundant enough to have an effect on the ocean's biological pump.  Consequently, large changes in their abundance or distribution may alter the ocean's carbon cycle, and potentially play a role in climate change.

Nervous systems and relationships to other animals
Salps are closely related to the pelagic tunicate groups Doliolida and Pyrosoma, as well as to other bottom-living (benthic) tunicates.

Although salps appear similar to jellyfish because of their simple body form and planktonic behavior, they are chordates: animals with dorsal nerve cords, related to vertebrates (animals with backbones).

Small fish swim inside salps as protection from predators.

Classification
The World Register of Marine Species lists the following genera and species in the order Salpida:

Order Salpida
Family Salpidae
Subfamily Cyclosalpinae
 Genus Cyclosalpa de Blainville, 1827
 Cyclosalpa affinis (Chamisso, 1819)
 Cyclosalpa bakeri Ritter, 1905
 Cyclosalpa foxtoni Van Soest, 1974
 Cyclosalpa ihlei  van Soest, 1974
 Cyclosalpa pinnata (Forskål, 1775)
 Cyclosalpa polae  Sigl, 1912
 Cyclosalpa quadriluminis  Berner, 1955
 Cyclosalpa sewelli  Metcalf, 1927
 Cyclosalpa strongylenteron  Berner, 1955
 Genus Helicosalpa  Todaro, 1902
 Helicosalpa komaii   (Ihle & Ihle-Landenberg, 1936)
 Helicosalpa virgula   (Vogt, 1854)
 Helicosalpa younti   Kashkina, 1973
Subfamily Salpinae' Genus Brooksia Metcalf, 1918 
 Brooksia berneri  van Soest, 1975
 Brooksia rostrata  (Traustedt, 1893)
 Genus Ihlea Metcalf, 1919
 Ihlea magalhanica   (Apstein, 1894)
 Ihlea punctata   (Forskål, 1775)
 Ihlea racovitzai   (van Beneden & Selys Longchamp, 1913)
 Genus Metcalfina Metcalfina hexagona   (Quoy & Gaimard, 1824)
 Genus Pegea Savigny, 1816
 Pegea bicaudata  (Quoy & Gaimard, 1826)
 Pegea confederata (Forsskål, 1775)
 Genus Ritteriella Metcalf, 1919
 Ritteriella amboinensis  (Apstein, 1904)
 Ritteriella picteti (Apstein, 1904)
 Ritteriella retracta  (Ritter, 1906)
 Genus Salpa Forskål, 1775
 Salpa aspera  Chamisso, 1819
 Salpa fusiformis Cuvier, 1804
 Salpa gerlachei  Foxton, 1961
 Salpa maxima Forskål, 1775
 Salpa thompsoni (Foxton, 1961)
 Salpa tuberculata  Metcalf, 1918
 Salpa younti  van Soest, 1973
 Genus Soestia (also accepted as Iasis)
 Soestia cylindrica  (Cuvier, 1804)
 Soestia zonaria  (Pallas, 1774)
 Genus Thalia Thalia cicar  van Soest, 1973
 Thalia democratica Forskål, 1775
 Thalia longicauda Quoy & Gaimard, 1824
 Thalia orientalis Tokioka, 1937
 Thalia rhinoceros Van Soest, 1975
 Thalia rhomboides Quoy & Gaimard, 1824
 Thalia sibogae Van Soest, 1973
 Genus Thetys Tilesius, 1802
 Thetys vagina Tilesius, 1802
 Genus Traustedtia Traustedtia multitentaculata Quoy & Gaimard, 1834
 Genus Weelia Yount, 1954
 Weelia cylindrica''  (Cuvier, 1804)

References

External links

 Plankton Chronicles Short documentary films & photos
 Pelagic tunicates (including salps) overview
 Scientific expedition to study salps near Antarctica - many details, with interviews, photos, videos, graphs
Sludge of slimy organisms coats beaches of New England Boston Globe October 9, 2006
 The salps on earthlife.net
 The role of salps in the study of origin of the vertebrate brain
 Jellyfish-like Creatures May Play Major Role In Fate Of Carbon Dioxide In The Ocean, ScienceDaily.com, July 2, 2006
 "Ocean 'Gummy Bears' Fight Global Warming", LiveScience.com, July 20, 2006
 How salps might help counteract global warming BBC News, September 26, 2007
 Jelly blobs may hold key to climate change ABC Radio, The World Today - Monday, 17 November 2008
 Salp Fact Sheet

Thaliacea